Maghnes Akliouche (born 25 February 2002) is a French professional footballer who plays as an attacking midfielder for Monaco.

Club career 
Maghnes Akliouche made his professional debut for AS Monaco on the 16 October 2021, coming on as a substitute in the 2-0 away Ligue 1 loss against Lyon.

International career
Born in France, Akliouche is of Algerian descent.

Honours

Individual
Maurice Revello Tournament Bronze Ball: 2022
Maurice Revello Tournament Best XI: 2022

References

External links
AS Monaco profile

FFF profile

2002 births
Living people
People from Tremblay-en-France
French footballers
French sportspeople of Algerian descent
Association football midfielders
AS Monaco FC players
Ligue 1 players
Championnat National 2 players
France youth international footballers